Crosserlough is a Gaelic Athletic Association club from Kilnaleck, County Cavan in Ireland. They are affiliated to Cavan GAA.

Honours
 Cavan Senior Football Championship: 10
 1958, 1961, 1966, 1967, 1968, 1969, 1970, 1971, 1972, 2020
 Cavan Intermediate Football Championship: 0
 Runner Up 2011
 Cavan Junior Football Championship: 1
 1967
 Cavan Under-21 Football Championship: 4
 1983, 1984, 1989, 1991
 Cavan Minor Football Championship: 7
 1954, 1955, 1963, 1964, 1986, 1989, 2016

Notable players
 Andy McCabe

References

External links
Crosserlough Official Website
Official Cavan GAA Website
Cavan Club GAA

Gaelic games clubs in County Cavan
Gaelic football clubs in County Cavan